Heroes of the Fourth Turning is a 2019 play by American writer Will Arbery. It focuses on a group of young Catholic intellectuals who reunite at their college in Wyoming. It premiered off-Broadway. It was received positively by both theatrical critics and conservative media and was a finalist for the 2020 Pulitzer Prize in drama.

History

The playwright, Will Arbery, is the son of Glenn Arbery, the president of Wyoming Catholic College (WCC), a small liberal arts college in Lander, Wyoming, that combines a great books curriculum with outdoor education. The play's fictional Transfiguration College is based on WCC. The title is a reference to the Fourth Turning, a concept in the Strauss–Howe generational theory. Throughout the writing process, he grappled with how to invite audiences to engage with the characters' ideas without asking them to empathize with them or providing a platform for hateful speech.

The play grew out of a shorter work that Arbery wrote for Ensemble Studio Theater shortly before the 2016 U.S. presidential election, depicting reactions to an anticipated Clinton victory. After Trump won, he rewrote and expanded the work. The play premiered off-Broadway at Playwrights Horizons in New York City in 2019, directed by Danya Taymor.

Characters
Emily, an empathetic daughter of professors at the college who lives with chronic pain
Justin, a stoic outdoorsman who works at the college
Kevin, an adrift alcoholic fascinated by the outside world
Teresa, a passionate disciple of Steve Bannon who lives in New York and writes for a right-wing publication
Gina Presson, a professor at the college and its incoming president, as well as Emily's mother

Plot 
The play is set in 2017, shortly after the Unite the Right rally. It opens with Justin shooting a deer. The four friends spend an evening in a backyard after attending a reunion at their college. They debate numerous political and religious topics. Throughout, a loud sound, which Justin says is a generator, intermittently interrupts the characters. Kevin, drunk, seeks a girlfriend. Midway through the play, they are joined by Gina Presson, their former mentor, who chastises Teresa for her new political beliefs. The play ends with an impassioned monologue from Emily about her pain.

Reception 
The play was received positively by theatrical critics. Jesse Green, writing for The New York Times, called it "a red-state unicorn" that "explores the lives and ideas of conservatives with affection, understanding and deep knowledge — if not, ultimately, approval." He praised "its eagerness to admit, and to subtly criticize by juxtaposition, all arguments". Vinson Cunningham, in The New Yorker, wrote, "Much of the thrill of the play comes in hearing ultraconservative ideas—scarce on New York stages—discussed in earnest, and carried to their most ominous conclusions." Alissa Wilkinson wrote for Vox, "Arbery is neither blindly accepting nor promoting of his characters; to validate or advance a specific worldview isn't the play's intention. Instead, it gently and sometimes joltingly lets Justin, Emily, Teresa, and Kevin lay out their constellation of individual beliefs on their own terms."

It was also received positively by conservative and Catholic publications, such as the Catholic Herald, whose Chad Pecknold wrote, "Arbery's play is remarkable for never letting progressives rest in their dismissals of conservatives, and also for holding up a critical mirror to the often messy disputes that conservatives have amongst themselves." In a glowing review for The American Conservative, Rod Dreher wrote, "I can't think of a single novel, film, or play that better illustrates the spirits of our culture war."

It was a finalist for the 2020 Pulitzer Prize in drama, described in the nomination as "a scrupulously hewn drama." At the 2020 Obie Awards, it won in the playwriting category and received a special citation for its creative team and ensemble. At the 2020 Lucille Lortel Awards, it picked up the top "outstanding play" prize.

References

External links
Heroes of the Fourth Turning at Playwrights Horizons

2019 plays
Plays about religion and science
Plays set in the 21st century
Plays set in Wyoming
Off-Broadway plays
Fiction set in 2017